Thomas Garrett (1789–1871) was an abolitionist and leader in the Underground Railroad movement before the American Civil War.

Thomas, Tom or Tommy Garrett may also refer to:

Thomas Garrett (Australian politician) (1830–1891), New South Wales politician, newspaper proprietor and land agent, father of the cricketer
Tom Garrett (1858–1943), Australian cricketer and public servant, son of the politician
Snuff Garrett (Thomas Lesslie Garrett, 1938–2015), American record producer
Thomas A. Garrett (born 1962), American fast food restaurant executive
Thomas Garrett (bishop), Anglican bishop in the Church of South India
Tom Garrett (Virginia politician) (born 1972), U.S. Representative from Virginia
Tommy Garrett (footballer) (1926–2006), English footballer
Tommy Garrett (Nebraska politician) (born 1954), American politician from Nebraska